Heutrégiville is a commune in the Marne department (region of Grand Est), in the arrondissement of Reims and in the canton of Bourgogne-Fresne in north-eastern France.

Geography
The village lies on the right bank of the Suippe, which flows northwestward through the commune.

See also
Communes of the Marne department

References

Communes of Marne (department)